James Mullinger is an English alternative comedian and finalist in the comedy competition "Jimmy Carr's Comedy Idol". He now lives in Atlantic Canada and has been nominated for a Canadian Comedy Award for Best Live Solo Show and a Just For Laughs Best Comedy Show Award. He is the star of Bell Aliant's Blimey! An Englishman in Atlantic Canada which has been nominated for and won numerous awards. Mullinger is also the co-writer and co-producer of the movie The Comedian's Guide to Survival, a British and Canadian co-production about Mullinger's early struggles as a comedian. Mullinger is played in the film by James Buckley and it also stars Jimmy Carr, Omid Djalili, Paul Kaye, Gilbert Gottfried, MyAnna Buring, Kevin Eldon and many more comedians. In 2015, Mullinger began co-hosting the genre and cult film podcast Field & Mullinger's Underground Nights, where he has interviewed filmmakers such as Troma Entertainment's Lloyd Kaufman, Dylan Greenberg Lowell Dean and Joshua Ligairi. In 2016 he sold out New Brunswick's biggest indoor venue Harbour Station, a process that was documented for a CBC film which aired in September 2016. The stand up special of the record breaking show was released internationally by Hulu and Amazon Prime, the first stand up special in history to be filmed in Atlantic Canada and released in the United States, England, Germany and Japan. In April 2018, Mullinger sold out the venue once again along with hundreds of other venues across Canada cementing his position as one of Canada's top comics.

Comedy career
Mullinger began doing stand up comedy in 2005. Within a year he had reached the final of three national competitions and appeared on Jimmy Carr's DVD Stand Up. 

He performed his first full-length solo show at the Camden Fringe in August 2009, titled James Mullinger Is The Bad Boy Of Feminism.  Both shows sold out and Time Out described it as "very funny stuff" and it was named one of the best shows by the Evening Standard, Metro and London Lite. He then toured the UK with the show culminating with two sold out shows at London's Soho Theatre in June 2010. He has toured three subsequent solo stand up shows (James Mullinger's Schooldays, An Hour of Killer Stand Up and The Man With No Shame) and continues to perform in clubs.

In May 2005 he created Upstairs at the Masons, a small comedy club in Mayfair, London. Every other week the club has several comedians performing.
In April 2016, Mullinger sold out New Brunswick’s biggest indoor venue Harbour Station. This record breaking show was documented for a CBC documentary film City On Fire which has aired in Canada.
 
In April 2018 he sold out Harbour Station a second time, this time beating how own record which made headlines around the world. 
 
Mullinger tours extensively to houses across Canada and England and written and produced a big screen feature film starring actors from Downton Abbey and Twilight about his early years in stand up, which was described as "unmissable" by GQ Magazine and "essential viewing. A funny, realistic look at what it takes to become a stand up comedian," by the Montreal Times.
 
Mullinger has raised more than $100,000 for Canadian charities. He has been nominated for both a Just For Laughs comedy award and a Canadian Comedy Award for Best Live Show.
  
He launched his own international magazine The Maritime Edit to share his love of small towns and cities across Canada with the rest of the world.

TV career
Mullinger's TV debut was on panel show Street Cred Sudoku alongside Robin Ince, Sue Perkins and Rufus Hound. From November 2011 to January 2012, Mullinger hosted 10 episodes of the world's first funny film review show titled Movie Kingdom for the DMAX channel on the Discovery Network. Devised and created by Mullinger alongside filmmaker Mark Murphy, the show took an irreverent view of Hollywood with honest reviews, comical interviews with A-list stars and sketches featuring comedians. Mullinger interviewed Hollywood actors Daniel Craig, Tom Cruise, George Clooney in the show and introduced other comedians such as Micky Flanagan, Rob Brydon, Andi Osho, Simon Pegg, Richard Herring and Scott Capurro.

The show was then developed with Comedy Central and became a web series titled A Moment With. Each week Mullinger would meet with the likes of Cameron Diaz, Anne Hathaway, Andrew Garfield, Emma Stone, Matthew McConaughey, Javier Bardem and comedians such as Greg Davies, Jerry Seinfeld, Jackie Mason, Ross Noble and Stewart Lee to discuss what makes them laugh.

Since moving to Canada in 2014 he has been the star of Bell Aliant's Blimey! An Englishman in Atlantic Canada. Partially scripted, the show follows Mullinger as he tours around Atlantic Canada performing in theatres, basements, arts centres, vineyards, food markets, aircraft hangars and anywhere else that will have him. It also features many other comedians who tour the East Coast of Canada with Mullinger. The show is currently on its third season and has been nominated for and won numerous awards.

In July 2022, it was announced that Mullinger would star in a sitcom based in Miramichi, New Brunswick called NBrexit. Mullinger will star alongside Adam Lordon, who is also writing and producing. The series is set to be released in 2023.

Early life
Mullinger grew up in Maidenhead, Berkshire. He was educated at King Edward's School, Witley then studied English Literature and Women's Studies at Kingston University before embarking on a career as a journalist and Photo Director. He began performing stand up comedy in 2005 and quickly made a name for himself as "one to watch" (The Guardian) by reaching the final of three major comedy competitions. They were: Jimmy Carr's Comedy Idol (which resulted in a performance alongside Carr at The Comedy Store that appeared on Carr's DVD 'Stand Up'), You Must Be Joking at the Newbury Comedy Festival and Your Comedy Stars at the Edinburgh Festival.

As a journalist Mullinger interviewed Rachel Weisz, Alan Hollinghurst, Scarlett Johansson, Jerry Seinfeld, Emily Mortimer, Dara Ó Briain, Russell Brand, Sheryl Crow, Charlie Brooker, Matt LeBlanc, Irvine Welsh, Rufus Wainwright and hundreds more. He won GQ magazine's Employee Of The Year Award a record three time during his time working for the magazine from 2000 to 2014.

References

External links
 James Mullinger's stand up special released internationally
 James Mullinger beats Jerry Seinfeld's sales record
 James Mullinger's official website
 The Maritime Edit, James Mullinger's magazine
 James Mullinger's tour dates
 Interview with James Mullinger from the set of his big screen biopic
 Montreal Gazette interview with James Mullinger
 Chortle feature on James Mullinger's movie
 Review of James Mullinger's show at the Montreal Fringe 2014
 Review of 2014 show
 James Mullinger live at the Imperial Theatre
 James Mullinger on why he loves Montreal
 Interview with James Mullinger about the success of his Canadian TV show
 James Mullinger speaking with Troma Entertainment's Lloyd Kaufman for Underground Nights

Year of birth missing (living people)
Living people
English male comedians
People educated at King Edward's School, Witley